The Longmen Mountains, also tautologically referred to in English-language publications as the Longmenshan Mountains, are a mountain range in Sichuan province in southwestern China.

Geography
The range runs in a roughly northeast to southwest direction, roughly from Guangyuan near the province's northeastern border, to the western part of the Chengdu Prefecture, in the central part of the province, where it approaches the southern end of the Qionglai Range. The Longmen Mountains form the northwestern rim of the Sichuan basin.

The uplift of the Longmen Mountains is a result of vertical slippage on the Longmenshan Fault.  The Longmen Mountains represent the eastern rim of the immense Tibetan Plateau.

Some maps use the name "Longmen Mountains" only for the northeastern section of the range, while the taller southwestern section is labeled Chaping Mountains.

References

External links
Scientists identified earthquake faults in Sichuan, China

Mountain ranges of Sichuan